Conjectura is a genus of very small sea snails or micromolluscs, marine gastropod molluscs in the family Conradiidae.

Species
Species within the genus Conjectura include:
 Conjectura agulhasensis (Thiele, 1925)
 Conjectura glabella (Murdoch, 1908)
 Conjectura solomonensis Rubio & Rolán, 2020
Species brought into synonymy
 Conjectura atypica Powell, 1937: synonym of Acremodontina atypica (Powell, 1937)
 Conjectura carinata Powell, 1940: synonym of Acremodontina carinata (Powell, 1940)
 † Conjectura congrua Laws, 1941: synonym of † Cirsonella congrua (Laws, 1941) (original combination)
 Conjectura poutama Smith, 1962: synonym of Acremodontina poutama (E. C. Smith, 1962)
 † Conjectura proava Marwick, 1931: synonym of † Cirsonella proava (Marwick, 1931)  (original combination)

References

 Powell A. W. B., New Zealand Mollusca, William Collins Publishers Ltd, Auckland, New Zealand 1979 
 Rubio F. & Rolán E. (2020). Conradiidae Golikov & Starobogatov, 1987 (= Crosseolidae Hickman, 2013) (Gastropoda, Trochoidea) from the Indo-Pacific. III. The genera Conradia and Conjectura. Novapex. 21(2-3): 49–91.

External links
 Finlay H.J. (1926). A further commentary on New Zealand molluscan systematics. Transactions of the New Zealand Institute. 57: 320-485, pls 18-23

 
Conradiidae
Gastropods of New Zealand